Tutta colpa di Freud (Italian for "All Freud’s Fault") is a 2014 Italian comedy film written and directed  by Paolo Genovese.

It was a box office hit, grossing over 8 million euros. The theme song "Tutta colpa di Freud" by Daniele Silvestri won the Ciak d'oro for best original song.

Plot 
Francesco is a psychologist who loves the theories of Sigmund Freud, who finds himself alone with three daughters: Martha, Sarah, and Emma. Francesco, who is an expert analysis of sex, begins to hate Freud, because it turns out that the daughters have a complicated love life: one is a lesbian, another still loves an old man over thirty years older than her, while the last is closed in on herself.

Cast

References

External links 

2014 films
2014 comedy films
Italian comedy films
Films directed by Paolo Genovese
2010s Italian-language films
2010s Italian films